The Ontario Council of University Libraries (OCUL) is an academic library consortium of Ontario’s 21 university libraries located in Toronto, Ontario, Canada. Formed in 1967, OCUL member institutions work together to maximize the expertise and resources of their institutions through shared services and projects. OCUL works together in a number of key areas of importance for library services, including collective content purchasing, shared digital infrastructure, external partnerships, and professional development initiatives.

OCUL is governed by the library directors of the member institutions and is supported by an executive committee, made up of five officers elected from the library directors. OCUL members form working groups, committees, and communities of practice to accomplish specific tasks or projects.  OCUL is an affiliate of the Council of Ontario Universities (COU).

History 
OCUL was founded in 1967 as the Ontario Council of University Librarians, working with the Council of Graduate Studies to ensure that graduate students and faculty members across the province had equitable access to the advanced library materials needed to support their research. The first chair of the Council was Doris E Lewis. OCUL changed its name to the Ontario Council of University Libraries in 1971.

Some of OCUL’s initiatives have included:

 the Inter-University Transit System (IUTS), created by OCUL in 1967 to facilitate interlibrary loans
 the Canadian University Reciprocal Borrowing Agreement (CURBA), allowing students and faculty to borrow from other Canadian universities at no cost
 the OCUL Map Group, which has been collaborating since 1973 on access to map and geospatial collections
 the Collaborative Futures Project, to facilitate collaborative management of library collections using the Ex Libris Alma platform
making nationally significant polling data from Ipsos available freely available online

Scholars Portal 
Scholars Portal is the technology service arm of OCUL. Founded in 2002, they provide a variety of services for OCUL members, including e-book and journal platforms, a repository of accessible texts for university students with print disabilities, and software hosting services. In 2012, Scholars Portal won the Ontario Library Association's OLITA Project Award for the Scholars GeoPortal. In 2013, Scholars Portal was accredited as the first Trustworthy Repository in Canada.

The service provider for Scholars Portal is the University of Toronto Libraries.

Member Institutions 

 Algoma University
 Brock University
 Carleton University
 University of Guelph
 Lakehead University
 Laurentian University
 McMaster University
 Nipissing University
 OCAD University
 Ontario Tech University (formerly UOIT)
 University of Ottawa
 Queen's University at Kingston
 Royal Military College of Canada
 Toronto Metropolitan University (formerly Ryerson University)
 University of Toronto
 Trent University
 University of Waterloo
 Western University
 Wilfrid Laurier University
 University of Windsor
 York University

Partnerships and memberships 
 Public Knowledge Project (major development partner)
 Open Content Alliance
 Consortia Canada
 International Coalition of Library Consortia
 Project COUNTER
 OCLC
 Dataverse
 Portage Network, an initiative of the Canadian Association of Research Libraries
 Internet Archive (contributor)
 The Keepers Registry

References 

Academic libraries in Canada
Library consortia